Jānis Lidmanis (18 January 1910 – 29 November 1986) was a Latvian footballer and basketballer.

Career
In the 1930s he was the captain of Latvia national football team for which he made 55 appearances (second result in the pre-war Latvian team) and scored 2 goals.

Lidmanis played of the football club Rīgas FK, the top Riga club of that era, and together with Ēriks Pētersons and Sergejs Maģers he made up the center midfield in the national team. One of his strengths was in the hands (he also played basketball and even played for Latvia in EuroBasket 1935), he also performed corner-kicks.

In 1944 Lidmanis together with his family immigrated to Germany and in 1949 to Australia. He died in Melbourne, Australia on 29 November 1986.

References

Latvian footballers
Latvian men's basketball players
Latvia international footballers
1910 births
1986 deaths
FIBA EuroBasket-winning players
Footballers from Riga
Association football midfielders
Latvian World War II refugees
Basketball players from Riga
Latvian emigrants to Australia